The 1979 Chicago Bears season was their 60th regular season and 14th postseason completed in the National Football League. The team finished with a 10–6 record under second year coach Neill Armstrong but lost to the Philadelphia Eagles in the opening round of the playoffs.

Offseason

NFL Draft

Roster

Schedule

Game summaries

Week 1
Network: CBS
Announcers: Dick Stockton and Johnny Morris 
Bob Thomas booted a pair of field goals and Walter Payton rushed for 125 yards on 36 carries in 80 degree heat as the Bears won their opener. Thomas who had a field goal attempt blocked by Packers' Mike Hunt in the first quarter converted from 25 and 19 yards in the second quarter and the Bears banked on an aggressive defense which was credited with five sacks for the triumph. Chester Marcol, who had a field goal blocked by Virgil Livers, later connected for Green Bay's only score with a 28 yarder. The Bears defense aided by a pair of excellent punts by Bob Parsons, kept the Packers in tough field condition in the first half when Green Bay was limited to only three first downs.

Week 14

Week 15: at Green Bay Packers

Playoffs

Standings

References

External links
 1979 Chicago Bears Season at www.bearshistory.com

Chicago Bears
Chicago Bears seasons
Chicago Bears